Penn Ikechukwu Orji (born 4 April 1991) is a Nigerian football player who  plays for Vasco S.C. in the Goa Professional League
as a central midfielder.

References

1981 births
Living people
Nigerian footballers
Expatriate footballers in India
Nigerian expatriate sportspeople in India
I-League players
JCT FC players
East Bengal Club players
Mohammedan SC (Kolkata) players
Indian Super League players
Kerala Blasters FC players
Sportspeople from Lagos
Association football midfielders
Stal Kraśnik players